Graphistemma is a species of plants in the Apocynaceae first described as a genus in 1876. It contains only one known species, Graphistemma pictum, native to Vietnam and S China (Guangdong, Guangxi, Hainan).

References

Flora of China
Flora of Vietnam
Monotypic Apocynaceae genera
Asclepiadoideae